Dieter von Holtzbrinck (born 29 September 1941 in Stuttgart) is one of the heirs to the Holtzbrinck publishing empire, founded by his father Georg von Holtzbrinck (1909–1983) in 1948. In 2006, his wealth was estimated at around US$1 billion.

He was a director of Dow Jones & Co. Inc., until he resigned on 19 July 2007, showing his disagreement with the takeover of the company by Rupert Murdoch's News Corp.

See also
Georg von Holtzbrinck Publishing Group
 :de:Dieter von Holtzbrinck Medien
List of billionaires

References

External links
Forbes.com: Forbes World's Richest People
 Holtzbrinck's resignation from the Dow Jones Board

German mass media owners
German publishers (people)
1941 births
Living people
German billionaires
20th-century German newspaper publishers (people)
21st-century German newspaper publishers (people)
Businesspeople from Stuttgart
Der Tagesspiegel people